Group D was one of four groups of nations competing at the 2007 AFC Asian Cup. The group's first round of matches began on 10 July and its last matches were played on 18 July. All six group matches were played at venues in Jakarta, Indonesia. The group consisted of hosts Indonesia, Bahrain, South Korea and Saudi Arabia.

Overall

All times are UTC+7.

Indonesia vs Bahrain

South Korea vs Saudi Arabia

Saudi Arabia vs Indonesia

Bahrain vs South Korea

Indonesia vs South Korea

Saudi Arabia vs Bahrain

Notes 

Group
Group
2007–08 in Indonesian football
2007–08 in Bahraini football
2007 in South Korean football